Chen Jialin (1942 – 7 July 2022) was a Chinese director.

Filmography
 Tang Ming Huang (1990)
 Wu Zetian (1995)
 The Taiping Heavenly Kingdom (2000)
 Kangxi Dynasty (2001) — co-director
 The Affaire in the Swing Age (2003) — co-directed with He Xianda
 The Great Dunhuang (2006)
 Da Qing Fengyun (2006)
 Chu Han Zhengxiong (2012)

References

External links
 

1942 births
2022 deaths
Chinese television directors
Chinese film directors
Beijing Film Academy alumni
Place of birth missing